is a 1974 anime television series produced by Tatsunoko Productions and directed by Hiroshi Sasagawa. The series premiered on Fuji TV on September 30, 1974 and ended on March 29, 1975.

Much later in 1991, Saban Entertainment has licensed and adapted the anime series for a worldwide release outside of Japan under the name, Jungle Tales and has condensed the 156 5-minute (serialized) episodes into 26 half-hour episodes. The voice casting and the English language dubbing production was done in-house by CINAR Studios, Inc. in Montreal, Canada. It has been broadcast on YTV in Canada. Heavy changes were made to the adaptation dub of the series. One being such is a new music score that was all digitally composed and sampled with an E-mu Proteus 2 Orchestra synthesizer. Other changes involve different character names used and gender changes for two characters. At the end of each condensed episode, a 3-minute music video was added to summarize the episode's plot. Many foreign dubs of the anime series would be mere translations of the dub.

Plot
Setting in the country of Urikupen kingdom, a rescue team that's consisting of animals goes onto missions to rescue forest animals in disastrous locations. A mobilization scenario is shown once a week stating "this week's Lifetime Achievement Award" which is given to the rescue workers.

Characters

Release
The series was produced by Tatsunoko Production and directed by Hiroshi Sasagawa. The anime has been licensed by Saban Entertainment in North America.

The opening theme is "Ganbare! Urikupen Kyūjotai" by Ichirou Mizuki and Columbia Yurokago Kai.

External links
 

Tatsunoko Production
Animal tales
Television series by Saban Entertainment